In A Land Of Plenty is a 10-episode British television drama serial produced by Sterling Pictures and Talkback for BBC Two in the United Kingdom. Adapted for television by Kevin Hood and Neil Biswas from the novel by Tim Pears. It was first broadcast in the United Kingdom in 2001 and describes a sprawling family saga taking place from the 1950s to the 1990s in England. Through the lives, deaths, tragedies and loves of the Freeman family, the series charts how Britain was shaped after World War II. It was subsequently broadcast in the USA on BBC America. The show was co-financed between WGBH-TV and the BBC and was produced by Michael Riley and John Chapman. Executive Producers were Peter Fincham and Tessa Ross.

The soundtrack was written by composer and musician Jocelyn Pook.

Critical reception

In A Land Of Plenty won critical acclaim. The Guardian described it as "stunning", The Sunday Times deemed it "One of the most acclaimed television series of all time", The Observer called it "the most ambitious television drama since Our Friends In The North," The Times stated "This extraordinary series had a richness of tone and texture all of its own - qualities you associate more with music and painting than with television".

External links

Shooting starts on BBC 2's 'In a Land of Plenty'
Off The Telly.com
Child is father of the man
New Statesman.com

2000s British drama television series
2001 British television series debuts
2001 British television series endings
2000s British television miniseries
BBC television dramas
Television series by Fremantle (company)
English-language television shows
Television shows set in Staffordshire
Period television series
Television series set in the 1950s